Megan Moss (born 22 March 2002) is a Bahamian athlete. She competed in the women's 4 × 400 metres relay event at the 2020 Summer Olympics. Moss also competed at the 2022 World Athletics Indoor Championships – Women's 400 metres in Belgrade, Serbia.

References

External links
 Kentucky Wildcats bio
 

2002 births
Living people
Bahamian female sprinters
Athletes (track and field) at the 2020 Summer Olympics
Olympic athletes of the Bahamas
Place of birth missing (living people)
Kentucky Wildcats women's track and field athletes
Athletes (track and field) at the 2018 Summer Youth Olympics